Henry C. Goldmark (1857–1941) was an American engineer who designed and installed the Panama Canal locks. He was an 1874 graduate of the New York University Polytechnic School of Engineering.

References

1857 births
1941 deaths
Polytechnic Institute of New York University alumni
American engineers